Love. Die. Repeat is an upcoming Philippine television drama romance series to be broadcast by GMA Network. Directed by Irene Villamor, it stars Jennylyn Mercado. It is set to premiere in 2023 on the network's Telebabad line up.

Cast and characters

Lead cast
 Jennylyn Mercado

Supporting cast
 Xian Lim
 Mike Tan
 Gardo Versoza
 Valerie Concepcion
 Myrtle Sarrosa
 Shyr Valdez
 Samantha Lopez
 Victor Anastacio
 Lui Manansala

Production
In August 2021, actress Kim Domingo was replaced by Myrtle Sarrosa after contracting the severe acute respiratory syndrome coronavirus 2. Principal photography commenced in September 2021. Production was halted in the same month, due to Jennylyn Mercado's medical emergency. Filming is set to resume in 2022.

References

Filipino-language television shows
GMA Network drama series
Philippine romance television series
Television shows set in the Philippines
Upcoming drama television series